Ood-Le-Uk the Wanderer is a children's novel by Alice Alison Lide and Margaret Alison Johansen, illustrated by Raymond Lufkin and published by Little, Brown & Co., in 1930. It tells the story of an Alaskan Eskimo who crosses the Bering Strait, has many adventures and returns to establish trade between his people and the Siberian tribesmen. The novel was first published in 1930 and was a runner-up for the Newbery Medal in 1931.

References

External links
  (1927–1958)
 

1930 American novels
American children's novels
Newbery Honor-winning works
Novels set in Russia
Novels set in Alaska
Inuit literature
1930 children's books